The 1979–80 Winnipeg Jets season was the franchise's eighth season since its inception in 1972, and its first season in the National Hockey League.

Offseason
After spending seven seasons in the World Hockey Association, in which the team won three Avco Cup championships, the Winnipeg Jets joined the National Hockey League, as did the Edmonton Oilers, Hartford Whalers and Quebec Nordiques, as the WHA disbanded.

On June 13, 1979, the Jets participated in the 1979 NHL Expansion Draft to fill out their roster, while on June 28, 1979, Winnipeg made their first ever trade, as the Jets sent Jamie Hislop to the Quebec Nordiques in exchange for Barry Legge.

On August 8, 1979, the Jets selected Jimmy Mann of the Sherbrooke Castors of the QMJHL with their first ever draft pick at the 1979 NHL Entry Draft.  In the fifth round, the Jets selected Thomas Steen from Leksands IF of the SEL.

During the off-season, the club announced that Tom McVie would be retained as head coach.  McVie became the Jets head coach late in the 1978-79 season, going 11-8-0 in nineteen games, followed by a record of 8-2 in the playoffs to lead Winnipeg to the Avco Cup.  McVie had head coaching experience in the NHL, as he coached the Washington Capitals to a 49-122-33 record from 1975 to 1978.

Lars-Erik Sjoberg was named captain of the team, as former captain Barry Long joined the Detroit Red Wings for the 1979-80 season.  Sjoberg captained Winnipeg from 1975 to 1978 in the WHA.

Regular season

Final standings

Schedule and results

Playoffs
The Jets failed to qualify for the playoffs, as their record of 20-49-11 earned them 51 points, good for fifth in the Smythe Division, 18 points behind the fourth place Edmonton Oilers for the final playoff position.

Player statistics

Regular season
Scoring

Goaltending

Transactions

Trades

Waivers

Free agents

Draft picks

NHL Amateur Draft
Winnipeg's picks at the 1979 NHL Entry Draft, which was held at the Queen Elizabeth Hotel in Montreal, Quebec on August 9, 1979.

Expansion Draft

Reclaimed Players
Reclaiming of Players: The 17 existing NHL teams were allowed to reclaim any rights to former WHA players they held.  The four incoming franchises, however, were allowed to protect up to two goaltenders and two skaters, voiding their NHL rights.  These players were considered "priority selections" in the expansion draft.  Gordie Howe was one of two special cases (the other being Wayne Gretzky), as a gentlemen's agreement between the Hartford Whalers and the Detroit Red Wings, which held his rights, led to the Wings declining to reclaim Howe.

These are Winnipeg players whose NHL rights were reclaimed when the WHA merged with the NHL.  This list is incomplete.

Jets selections

References
Jets on Hockey Database

Winnipeg Jets (1972–1996) seasons
Winnipeg Jets season, 1979-80
Winn